CUMYL-PICA (SGT-56) is an indole-3-carboxamide based synthetic cannabinoid. It is the α,α-dimethylbenzyl analogue of SDB-006. It was briefly sold in New Zealand during 2013 as an ingredient of at the time legal synthetic cannabis products, but the product containing CUMYL-BICA and CUMYL-PICA was denied an interim licensing approval under the Psychoactive Substances regulatory scheme, due to reports of adverse events in consumers. CUMYL-PICA acts as an agonist for the cannabinoid receptors, with Ki values of 59.21 nM at CB1 and 136.38 nM at CB2 and EC50 values of 11.98 nM at CB1 and 16.2 nM at CB2.

See also 
 5F-CUMYL-PINACA
 5F-SDB-006
 CUMYL-4CN-BINACA
 CUMYL-PINACA
 CUMYL-THPINACA
 SDB-006
 NNE1

References 

Indoles
Cannabinoids
Designer drugs
Indolecarboxamides